Adham Khan (1531 – 16 May 1562) was a general of Akbar. He was the younger son of Maham Anga, and thus, was the foster brother of Akbar. In his fourth regnal year, Akbar married him to Javeda Begum, the daughter of Baqi Khan Baqlani.

Conquest of Malwa

After the dismissal of Mann, Adham was appointed as a general and was sent to Malwa to capture it.

In 1561, the Mughal army led by Adham invaded Malwa. They defeated the army of Ishaan, the Sultan of Malwa in the battle of Sarangpur on March 29, 1561. All his treasures, elephants and his harem was captured by the victors. Rani Roopmati killed herself by taking poison. After the victory, Adham Khan sent to the emperor Akbar a report of victory along with only a few elephants, himself appropriating the rest of the spoils.

Akbar resented this insolence and personally marched to Sarangpur. He took Adham Khan by surprise, who surrendered to Akbar and his spoils were seized. Later, he was recalled from Malwa and the command was made over to Pir Muhammad Khan.

Execution of Adham Khan and its aftermath

In November 1561, Akbar's favourite general Ataga Khan, was appointed wakil (the prime minister), replacing Munim Khan. His appointment displeased Maham Anga.

On May 16, 1562, Adham Khan, accompanied by a few ruffians burst in upon him as he sat in the hall of audience and murdered him. Adham Khan then rushed to the inner apartment, where he was caught by Akbar, just roused from sleep, by tumult. Akbar replied to Adham Khan's explanation to palliate his crime by striking him down with a heavy blow of his fist. Adham was thrown down twice from the roof of a one storied building whose height was about 10 feet (which was possibly the reason why he had to be thrown down twice) by royal order and put to death. Akbar himself broke this news to Maham Anga, who made a simple but dignified reply that he did well. The sudden demise of Adham Khan made his mother depressed, and after forty days, she also died.

After his death, his body was sent with respect to Delhi. Akbar built the mausoleum of Adham Khan in Mehrauli, where both, Adham Khan and his mother Maham Anga, were buried. This mausoleum, popularly known as Bhul-bhulaiyan, due to a labyrinthine maze inside, stands on the ramparts of the Lal Kot, located in the north of the Qutub Minar.

Personal life
He married Javeda Begum, the daughter of Baqi Khan Baqlani, in 1552. He had 2 sons and 2 daughters.

Gallery

See also
 Adham Khan's Tomb

Notes

Mughal generals
1562 deaths
Year of birth unknown
16th-century Indian Muslims
Akbar
1531 births
People from Kabul